Sissi – Fateful Years of an Empress is a 1957 Austrian film directed by Ernst Marischka and starring Romy Schneider, Karlheinz Böhm, Magda Schneider, Gustav Knuth and Josef Meinrad, costumes by  (Gerda Gottschlich). It was entered into the 1958 Cannes Film Festival.

It is the last film in the Sissi trilogy, following Sissi (1955) and Sissi – The Young Empress (1956). The director Ernst Marischka planned a fourth film, but Schneider refused to play Sissi any longer. She appeared 15 years later again as Empress Elisabeth in Luchino Visconti's 1972 film Ludwig.

Plot
Empress Elisabeth of Austria, nicknamed Sissi, enjoys travelling in Hungary. She welcomes the politically valuable friendship of Count Andrássy, but when he confesses he is in love with her, she returns to Vienna lest the relationship become too intimate. Her time in Hungary is only a temporary relief from the frustrations of court life in Vienna, where dutiful Franz Josef remains at his desk and allows his strict, domineering mother Sophie to interfere in the raising of his daughter with Sissi, Sophie. Sissi decides to return and meets Franz underway who was coming to Hungary to bring her back to Vienna. They decide to take a vacation in Bad Ischl but Sissi falls ill and is diagnosed with possibly fatal tuberculosis. On doctors' orders Franz Josef must allow his mother to remove his daughter from Sissi's keeping.

In poor health, deprived of the company of husband and child, Sissi is in danger of losing the will to live as she travels to healthier climates on Madeira and Corfu. Desperately needed psychosomatic therapy appears in the form of her indestructibly positive mother Ludovika, who lovingly nurses Sissi's illness and restores her zest for life by taking her on idyllic walks. Once again Oberst Böckl, the clumsy body-guard whose doting admiration for the empress borders on the improper, provides a comical note, as he does in each part of the trilogy.

Finally, Sissi recovers and rejoins her husband on an official visit to Milan and Venice, Austria's remaining possessions in northern Italy. Italian nationalists have prepared a hostile welcome for the Habsburg sovereigns; the Milanese nobility send their servants, dressed in noble clothing, to a royal command performance at La Scala, at which the orchestra begins with the melody of Joseph Haydn's "Gott erhalte Franz den Kaiser" but smoothly transitions to Verdi's chorus "Va, pensiero" from Nabucco and the disguised servants in the audience sing it in protest against Austrian rule. There is a moment of comic relief when, after the opera, Franz Josef and Sissi receive the disguised servants at a formal reception, where the servants are presented to the imperial couple under the names of their aristocratic masters and mistresses. Sissi is aware that she is not meeting the true nobility, but when the real nobles realize their servants were introduced to the emperor and empress, they shriek in despair and panic at the idea that the imperial couple believe the awkward, common servants were really the aristocrats. In Venice, crowds stand in hostile silence at the couple's procession by royal barge on the Grand Canal and as they pass, Italian nationalist flags are defiantly unfurled from behind shuttered windows. But the emotional Italians melt when they witness the openly loving reunion between Sissi and her little daughter on St Mark's Square.

Cast 
 Romy Schneider as Empress Elisabeth of Austria, or "Sissi"
 Karlheinz Böhm as Emperor Franz Joseph I of Austria
 Vilma Degischer as Archduchess Sophie, Franz Joseph's mother
  as Archduke Franz Karl, Franz Joseph's father
 Magda Schneider as Duchess Ludovika in Bavaria, Sissi's mother
 Gustav Knuth as Duke Max in Bavaria, Sissi's father
  as Princess Helene in Bavaria, or "Néné", Sissi's older sister
 Walther Reyer as Count Andrássy
  as Count Batthyány
 Josef Meinrad as Lieutenant Colonel Böckl
 Senta Wengraf as Countess Bellegarde (Pauline von Königsegg)
  as Dr. Seeburger
  as Henriette Mendel
  as Prince Ludwig
  as Archduke Ferdinand Max
  as Count Windisch-Graetz

References

External links
 

1957 films
1950s biographical drama films
1950s historical drama films
Austrian biographical drama films
Austrian historical drama films
Cultural depictions of Empress Elisabeth of Austria
Cultural depictions of Franz Joseph I of Austria
Films directed by Ernst Marischka
Biographical films about Austrian royalty
Films set in Austria
Films set in Bavaria
Films set in Greece
Films set in Hungary
Films set in Italy
Films set in Portugal
Films set in the 1860s
Films set in Vienna
Monarchy in fiction
Austrian sequel films
Films set in the Austrian Empire
Films set in the Kingdom of Bavaria
Films set in the Kingdom of Lombardy–Venetia